The Brazilian Labour Renewal Party (PRTB) is a conservative Brazilian political party. It was founded in 1994 and its electoral number is 28. According to the party's official website, the PRTB's main ideology is participatory economics: "to establish an economic system based on participatory decision making as the primary economic mechanism for allocation in society".

Overview 
It comes from members of the extinct Renovator Labour Party, a party that functioned between 1985 and 1993, which had merged with the Social Labour Party, originating the Progressive Party. This group, led by Levy Fidelix, had already tried to organize the PTRB, which only ran in the 1994 elections.

During the 1998 Brazilian general election, Fernando Collor de Mello decided to run again for the office of President of Brazil for the same party that elected him in 1989: the National Reconstruction Party (PRN), now the Christian Labour Party (PTC). The PRTB, together with the PRN, formed the Renova Brasil (Renew Brazil) coalition, in support of the former President of the Republic. The Superior Electoral Court (TSE), however, prevented his candidacy from materializing, due to the eight-year period in which he could not be elected to any elective term.

It was registered on the Superior Electoral Court on 18 February 1997 and Levy Fidelix was elected as party president.

In 2006 the party gained electoral importance because of the election of ex-President Fernando Collor de Mello, impeached in 1992, who made his comeback in national politics as a Senator. However, in 2007 De Mello left PRTB and switched to the Brazilian Labour Party.

The party candidated its president Levy Fidelix in the Brazilian presidential election of 2010 and he obtained 57,960 votes (0.06%). In the second round, Fidelix endorsed left-wing candidate Dilma Rousseff.

In the Brazilian general election of 2014, Fidelix was candidate again and presented himself with a conservative speech and, according to him, the only right-wing candidate. In the first round of the general election, Fidelix received 446,878 votes, representing 0.43% of the popular vote. The PRTB's founder ranked 7th out of 11 candidates, however achieved his best performance in an election throughout his career. In the second round, Fidelix supported candidate Aécio Neves.

For the Brazilian general election of 2018, the PRTB formed the coalition "Brazil above everything, God above everyone" (Brasil acima de tudo, Deus acima de todos) together with the Social Liberal Party to support candidate Jair Bolsonaro. In May 2018, his pick for Vice President, Hamilton Mourão, joined the party.

Controversies
The party has been accused of having links with neo-Nazi and neo-fascist organizations and promoting fake news and conspiracy theories on the internet.

During 2014 Brazilian general election the party leader and candidate Levy Fidelix during a debate made a statement that homosexuals “need psychological care” and were better kept “well away from [the rest of] us." He also said that Brazil’s population of 200 million would be reduced by half if homosexuality were encouraged because “the excretory system” does not function as a means of reproduction. Fidelix obtained 0.43% of votes.

Electoral history

Presidential elections

Legislative elections

Notable members

References 

1997 establishments in Brazil
Anti-communist organizations
Conservative parties in Brazil
Labour parties
National conservative parties
Nationalist parties in Brazil
Political parties established in 1997
Political parties in Brazil
Right-wing populist parties
Right-wing populism in South America
Far-right political parties in Brazil
Far-right political parties
Organizations that oppose LGBT rights
Social conservative parties
Right-wing politics in Brazil
Right-wing parties in South America
Economic nationalism